Interstate 10 (I-10) is the southernmost cross-country highway in the Interstate Highway System. This freeway is part of the originally planned network that was laid out in 1956, and its last section was completed in 1990.

I-10 stretches from the Pacific Ocean at State Route 1 (SR 1, Pacific Coast Highway) in Santa Monica, California, to I-95 in Jacksonville, Florida. Major cities connected by I-10 include (from west to east) Los Angeles, Phoenix, Tucson, Las Cruces, El Paso, San Antonio, Houston, Baton Rouge, New Orleans, Gulfport, Mobile, Pensacola, Tallahassee, and Jacksonville. Over one-third of its total length is within the state of Texas, where the freeway spans the state at its widest breadth.

Route description 

|-
|California
|
|-
|Arizona
|
|-
|New Mexico
|
|-
|Texas
|
|-
|Louisiana
|
|-
|Mississippi
|
|-
|Alabama
|
|-
|Florida
|
|-
|Total
|
|}

California 

Between its west terminus in Santa Monica, California, and the major East Los Angeles Interchange, I-10 is known as the Santa Monica Freeway. The Santa Monica Freeway is also called the Rosa Parks Freeway, named after the civil rights activist, for the segment beginning at I-405 (San Diego Freeway), and ending at I-110/SR 110 (Harbor Freeway). Other names exist for I-10. For example, a sign near the western terminus of the highway in Santa Monica proclaims this highway the Christopher Columbus Transcontinental Highway.

I-10 is known to a considerably lesser degree as the Veterans Memorial Highway, and it is listed as a Blue Star Memorial Highway. In Palm Springs, I-10 is also named the Sonny Bono Memorial Freeway, named after the singer, actor, and politician, as a tribute to the late entertainer who served both as the mayor of Palm Springs, and as a US Representative. Another stretch a short distance east in Indio is proclaimed the Doctor June McCarroll Memorial Freeway, named after the nurse known for popularizing road lane striping.

Arizona 

In Arizona, the highway is designated the Pearl Harbor Memorial Highway, commemorating the attack on Pearl Harbor. The portion through Phoenix is named the Papago Freeway, and it is a vital piece of the metropolitan Phoenix freeway system. This designation starts at State Route 101 (SR 101; Loop 101), near 99th Avenue, and it continues eastward to the interchange southeast of downtown which is the terminus of I-17.

Near Buckeye, the freeway has milemarkers posted every  from 112.2 to 110.8 with the Interstate shield and direction of travel posted on the westbound lanes. On the eastbound lanes, milemarkers from 110.8 to 112.2 do not include the I‑10 shield and direction of travel.

From the southern terminus of I-17 to the southernmost junction with SR 202 (Loop 202), the highway is signed as the Maricopa Freeway. This name holds true as well for I-17 from its southern terminus to the Durango Curve south of Buckeye Road. From Loop 202 south to the eastern terminus of I-8 just southeast of Casa Grande, the highway is declared the Pearl Harbor Memorial Highway. The Arizona Department of Transportation also has maps that show it as the Maricopa Freeway, while the American Automobile Association and other sources show it as the Pima Freeway. The latter's name is used on a stretch of Loop 101 from Loop 202 to I-17.

Between I-17 in Phoenix and the I-19 interchanges in Tucson, I-10 is included in the federally designated CANAMEX Corridor, extending from Mexico City, Mexico, to Edmonton, Alberta.

In Tucson, between I-10 mileposts 259 and 260 are interchange ramps connecting I-10 with the northern terminus of I-19.

New Mexico 

In New Mexico, I-10 more or less follows the former path of US Route 80 (US 80) across the state, although major portions of old US 80 were bypassed in the western New Mexico Bootheel and in Doña Ana County. I-10 passes through three southern New Mexico municipalities of regional significance before the junction with I-25: Lordsburg, Deming, and Las Cruces. Most of I-10 in New Mexico, between exit 24 and exit 135, is concurrent with US 70.

At Lordsburg is the western junction of US 70 and a concurrency; the two highways are joined all the way to Las Cruces. Several exits between Lordsburg and Deming are either for former towns (including Separ, Quincy, and Gage) or lack any town at all.

At Deming is the western junction of US 180, which also forms a concurrency with I-10 all the way to El Paso.  north of Deming on US 180 is State Road 26 (NM 26) which serves as a short cut to north I-25 and Albuquerque.

I-10/US 70/US 180 continue east to Las Cruces which is the southern end of I-25. US 70 leaves I-10 (prior to the junction with I-25), heading northeast to Alamogordo and passing through the north side of Las Cruces. The junction with I-25 occurs just south of the New Mexico State University campus, on the southern end of Las Cruces. I-10/US 180 becomes concurrent with US 85 at the junction with I-25. I-10/US 85/US 180 then turns south to the Texas state line, crossing it at Anthony.

Texas 

From the state line with New Mexico (at Anthony) to State Highway 20 (SH 20) in west El Paso, I-10 is bordered by frontage roads South Desert for lanes along I-10 east (actually headed south) and North Desert for lanes along I-10 west (headed north). The Interstate then has no frontage roads for  but regains them east of downtown and retains them to Clint. In this stretch, the frontage roads are Gateway East for the eastbound lanes and Gateway West for the westbound lanes. All four frontage roads are one-way streets. Gateway East and Gateway West are notable, in particular, for the Texas Department of Transportation (TxDOT)'s liberal usage of the Texas U-turn at most underpasses of I-10 on this stretch.

A small portion of I-10 from Loop 1604 to Downtown San Antonio is known as the Northwest Expressway or the McDermott Freeway, while another portion from downtown to Loop 1604 east is called East Expressway or José López Freeway. In Downtown San Antonio, it has a concurrency with I-35, and, throughout most of the northwest side of the city, it has a concurrency with US 87, which begins in Comfort, before turning off and heading east out of the city. Starting in San Antonio, it follows a more direct route of US 90, with occasional small concurrences.

In Houston, from the western suburb of Katy to downtown, I-10 is commonly known as the Katy Freeway. This section has as many as 26 lanes (12 mainlanes, eight lanes of access roads, and six mid-freeway high-occupancy toll [HOT]/high-occupancy vehicle [HOV] lanes, not counting access road turning lanes) and is one of the widest freeways in the world. The space for the expansion was the right-of-way of the old Missouri–Kansas–Texas Railroad. The section east of Downtown Houston is officially known as the East Freeway, although it is widely known by locals as the Baytown East Freeway due to a marketing push by Baytown, one of the largest cities in Greater Houston.

In Beaumont, it is known as I-10 south, south of Calder Avenue, and I-10 north, north of Calder Avenue. It is known as I-10 east from the I-10 curve to the Neches River, which is Beaumont's and Jefferson County's eastern boundary line. Continuing into Orange County and passing through the city of Orange at the easternmost end of Texas, and located at the base of the Sabine River bridge is the last I-10 milemarker in Texas, number 880, before entering into Louisiana. Approximately 36 percent of I-10's entire route is located within Texas; the longest segment of any signed Interstate within one state.

Louisiana 

In Lake Charles, a  loop route signed as I-210 branches off of I-10 and goes through the southern portion of the city. In Lafayette, it serves as the southern terminus for I-49. Shortly afterward, there is an  stretch of elevated highway between Lafayette and Baton Rouge known as the Atchafalaya Swamp Freeway, as it goes over the Atchafalaya River, across the Atchafalaya Basin Bridge, and the adjacent swamps. It crosses the Mississippi River at the Horace Wilkinson Bridge in Baton Rouge, where the eastbound lanes are the only portion of I-10 that is essentially one lane. After crossing the Horace Wilkinson Bridge, two lanes from I-110 south merge with two lanes I-10 east into three lanes with one of the eastbound lanes quickly becoming an exit only lane. After this, the highway is back to four lanes approaching the I-10/I-12 split. I-12 links Baton Rouge to Slidell and bypasses I-10's southward jog through New Orleans by remaining north of Lake Pontchartrain. On this route, I-10 serves as the southern terminus for I-55 in LaPlace and crosses over a portion of Lake Pontchartrain on the I-10 Bonnet Carré Spillway Bridge. In New Orleans, a stretch of I-10 from the I-10/I-610 Junction near the Orleans–Jefferson parish line to the US 90/US 90 Business (US 90 Bus.) junction is known as the Pontchartrain Expressway. A dip near the I-10/I-610 junction to travel under a railroad track is one of the lowest points in New Orleans and is highly susceptible to flooding. Buildups of rainwater dozens of feet deep (several meters) are commonplace during hurricanes. Near Slidell, I-10 serves as the eastern terminus of I-12 and the southern terminus of I-59; turning east to the Mississippi state line. The highway is known as the Stephen Ambrose Memorial Highway, named after the historian and writer, until the state line.

I-310 and I-510 are the built sections of what was slated to be I-410, which would have acted as a southern bypass of New Orleans. They function as spur routes serving lower density or suburban areas west and east of New Orleans respectively. I-610 is a shortcut from the eastern to western portion of New Orleans avoiding I-10's detour into the New Orleans Central Business District.

Mississippi 

I-10 in Mississippi runs from the Louisiana state line to the Alabama state line through Hancock, Harrison, and Jackson counties on the Gulf Coast. It passes through the northern sections of Gulfport and Biloxi while passing just north of Pascagoula and Bay St. Louis. It also passes right south of the NASA Stennis Space Center. The highway roughly parallels US 90.

The law defining the route of I-10 is Mississippi Code § 65-3-3.

Alabama 

I-10 crosses over the border from Jackson County, Mississippi, and it goes through Mobile County in southwestern Alabama. In Mobile, I-10 is the southern terminus of I-65. In downtown Mobile, I-10 goes through one of the few highway tunnels in Alabama, the George Wallace Tunnel under the Mobile River.

The speed limit of the eastbound approach is posted at  because of the sharp downward curve approaching the tunnel. The highway is next to Battleship Parkway. On the other side of Mobile Bay, the highway goes through the suburban area of Baldwin County before passing through Malbis, Loxley, and then on to the Perdido River to cross over into Florida.

Florida 

I-10 travels north of the cities of Pensacola and Tallahassee, serving the suburban areas within each respective city. In the former, a  spur route serves the downtown area, signed as I-110. Most of I-10 in Florida travels through some of the least-populated areas in the state, with large portions of I-10 west of I-295 in Jacksonville having only four lanes.

In Jacksonville, as in Arizona, I-10 is designated as the Pearl Harbor Memorial Highway. The route ends at an interchange with I-95 northwest of Downtown Jacksonville. Throughout much of Florida, I-10 is also State Road 8 (SR 8), though it is not signed as such. (I-110 in Pensacola being known as SR 8A.)

History 

While the highway has existed as far back as 1957, the last section of the entire route to be completed was a section of the Papago Freeway from both I-17 interchanges (including the Papago Freeway Tunnel) in Phoenix, which opened in 1990.

Many widening projects have taken place on the interstate in the late 2000s. In Pensacola, Florida, a  stretch of I-10 was widened to six lanes in 2008. In Tallahassee, Florida, construction was completed in June 2009 on a project to widen a roughly  stretch of I-10 to six lanes (eight in some places). In Tucson, Arizona, all exits between Prince Road and 22nd Street reopened after an extensive, three-year improvement project. I-10 was widened from six to eight lanes, and seven bridges and underpasses have been built to deal with congestion. I-10 from the I-8 interchange in Casa Grande to Marana was widened from four to six lanes from the second half of 2007, to its completion in 2009. Also in Arizona, from Verrado Way in Verrado, Buckeye, all the way to Avondale, the Interstate was widened throughout the late 2000s and early 2010s, with an HOV lane added between Estrella Parkway in Goodyear and Loop 101.

Texas formerly shared the highest speed limit in the nation with Utah's test section of I-15.

As far back as the 1990s, Florida and Alabama have considered a connector that would link Dothan, Alabama, with I-10. In 2008, a proposal to make this new highway a toll road and to expedite its construction to complete it in five years surfaced. In 2012, federal funds previously set aside for the connector were allocated to other projects. In 2014, Florida sought bids for a feasibility study.

Between August 27 and September 10, 2015, 10 out of 11 Phoenix freeway shootings occurred on I-10. The last incident, on September 10, took place on Loop 202.

In March 2019, the two members of Liverpool indie pop duo Her's died alongside their tour manager after a head-on collision on I-10 near Salome, Arizona.

Junction list 
California
  in Santa Monica
  on the Mar Vista–Palms–West Los Angeles neighborhood line
  on the South Los Angeles, Mid-City–Central Los Angeles neighborhood line
  in Boyle Heights; the highways travel concurrently through Boyle Heights.
  in Boyle Heights
  in Boyle Heights
  on the Monterey Park–Alhambra city line
  in Baldwin Park
  on the Pomona–San Dimas city line
  in Ontario
  in Colton
  in Redlands (future I-210)
  in Beaumont
  in Beaumont
  near Palm Springs
  in Whitewater
  near Indio
  in Desert Center
  in Blythe; the highways travel concurrently to Quartzsite, Arizona.
Arizona
  in Quartzsite
  southwest of Brenda
  in Buckeye
  in Goodyear
  on the Avondale–Tolleson city line
  in Phoenix
  in Phoenix
  in Phoenix
  in Phoenix
  in Phoenix
  in Phoenix
  on the Phoenix–Chandler city line
  in Casa Grande
  in Tucson
  north-northwest of Cochise; the highways travel concurrently to northeast of Willcox.
New Mexico
  south-southwest of Lordsburg
  southwest of Lordsburg
  north of Hachita
  in Las Cruces
  in Lordsburg; the highways travel concurrently to Las Cruces.
  in Deming; the highways travel concurrently to El Paso, Texas.
  on the Las Cruces–University Park line. I-10/US 85 travels concurrently to El Paso, Texas
Texas
  in El Paso
  in El Paso
  in Van Horn
  at Scroggins Draw
  west of Fort Stockton; the highways travel concurrently to east-southeast of Fort Stockton.
  in Fort Stockton
  in Fort Stockton; the highways travel concurrently to east-southeast of Fort Stockton.
  west-southwest of Iraan
  in Sonora
  in Junction. I-10/US 83 travels concurrently to north of Segovia.
  northwest of Mountain Home
  in Comfort; the highways travel concurrently through San Antonio.
  in San Antonio
  in San Antonio; the highways travel concurrently through Downtown San Antonio.
  in San Antonio. I-10/US 90 travels concurrently to west-southwest of Seguin.
  in San Antonio
  in San Antonio; I-10/SH 130 travel concurrently until east of Seguin.
  in Seguin
  in Luling
  east of Waelder
  in Schulenburg
  east-northeast of Schulenburg
  west-southwest of Glidden
  east of Columbus; the highways travel concurrently to Sealy.
  in Sealy; the highways travel concurrently to west-southwest of Brookshire.
  in Katy; the highways travel concurrently through Houston.
  in Houston
  in Houston
  in Houston
  in Houston
  in Beaumont; the highways travel concurrently through Beaumont.
  in Beaumont
  in Beaumont; the highways travel concurrently to Toomey, Louisiana.
Louisiana
  east of Sulphur
  west-southwest of Westlake; the highways travel concurrently through Lake Charles.
  in Lake Charles
  east-northeast of Lake Charles
  east-northeast of Iowa
  in Lafayette
  in Baton Rouge
  in Baton Rouge
  southeast of Sorrento
  in LaPlace
  in LaPlace
  west of Kenner
  in New Orleans
  in New Orleans
  in New Orleans
  in New Orleans
  in New Orleans
  in New Orleans
  in New Orleans
  in Slidell
  in Slidell
Mississippi
  in Gulfport
  in D'Iberville
Alabama
  on the Theodore–Tillmans Corner line.
  in Mobile
  in Mobile
  east of Mobile
  in Daphne
Florida
  on the Brent–Ensley CDP line
  on the Brent–Ensley–Ferry Pass CDP line
  in Ferry Pass
  in DeFuniak Springs
  south of Cottondale
  in Midway
  in Tallahassee
  in Tallahassee
  in Tallahassee
  north-northeast of Capps
  south-southeast of Greenville
  southeast of Falmouth
  north-northeast of Live Oak
  south of White Springs
  northwest of Five Points
  in Lake City
  southwest of Sanderson
  south-southwest of Baldwin
  in Jacksonville
  in Jacksonville; the highways travel concurrently through Jacksonville
  in Jacksonville

Auxiliary routes 
 Los Angeles, California: I-110, I-210, I-710
 San Bernardino, California: I-210
 El Paso, Texas: I-110
 San Antonio, Texas: I-410
 Houston, Texas: I-610
 Lake Charles, Louisiana: I-210
 Baton Rouge, Louisiana: I-110
 New Orleans, Louisiana: I-310, I-510, I-610, I-910
 Biloxi, Mississippi: I-110
 Pensacola, Florida: I-110
 Business routes of Interstate 10

See also

Notes

References

External links 

 
 Interstate Guide: I-10

 
10